In enzymology, a hygromycin-B kinase is an enzyme that catalyzes the chemical reaction

ATP + hygromycin B  ADP + 7"-O-phosphohygromycin

Thus, the two substrates of this enzyme are ATP and hygromycin B, whereas its two products are ADP and 7''-O-phosphohygromycin.

This enzyme belongs to the family of transferases, specifically those transferring phosphorus-containing groups (phosphotransferases) with an alcohol group as acceptor.  The systematic name of this enzyme class is ATP:hygromycin-B 7"-O-phosphotransferase. This enzyme is also called hygromycin B phosphotransferase.

References 

 
 

EC 2.7.1
Enzymes of unknown structure